The Vaughans were an Australian musical group. They released one studio album, and their single, "Who Farted?", reached number 43 in Australia in 1995.

Discography

Albums

Singles

Awards and nominations

ARIA Music Awards
The ARIA Music Awards are a set of annual ceremonies presented by Australian Recording Industry Association (ARIA), which recognise excellence, innovation, and achievement across all genres of the music of Australia. They commenced in 1987.

! 
|-
| 1996 || "Who Farted?" || ARIA Award for Best Comedy Release ||  || 
|-

References

Australian comedy musical groups
Musical groups established in 1987